Shawn Kuykendall (February 21, 1982 – March 12, 2014) was an American professional soccer player; he competed with D.C. United and the New York Red Bulls of Major League Soccer.

Biography
His parents are Kurt and Sherry Kuykendall. Kurt Kuykendall was inducted into the American University Athletics Hall of Fame in 1997, and was a 1973 All-American goalkeeper. Kurt played for the Washington Diplomats and the New York Cosmos in the NASL. Both parents attended American University, in Washington D.C.

Other Kuykendalls have signed with American University. Shawn's brother, JP, played between 2004 and 2008. His other brother, Kris, graduated in 2003, and was co-captain of the 2002 team.

In November 2013, Kuykendall was diagnosed with an advanced and incurable form of thymus cancer. He died on March 12, 2014.

A non-profit organization supporting the fight against pediatric cancer called Kuykenstrong was formed in Kuykendall's memory following his death.

Career
Drafted by D.C. United, in the 4th round – 48th overall – in the 2005 MLS Supplemental Draft. Kuykendall played his first game on July 15, 2005.
In 2006, he and Dema Kovalenko, were traded to the New York Red Bulls.

References

External links
 Seattle Times
 AU Eagles

1982 births
2014 deaths
American University alumni
Cape Cod Crusaders players
D.C. United players
New York Red Bulls players
Sportspeople from Fairfax, Virginia
USL League Two players
Major League Soccer players
Soccer players from Virginia
American Eagles men's soccer players
D.C. United draft picks
Deaths from cancer in Virginia
Deaths from thymus cancer
Association football midfielders
American soccer players